This is list of archives in Algeria.

Archives in Algeria 

 Archives de la Wilaya d'Oran
 Centre Algerien de la Cinematographie
 Centre Nationale des Archives (Algeria)

See also 
 List of archives
 List of museums in Algeria
 Culture of Algeria

Bibliography

External links 

 
Archives
Algeria
Archives